The Server Base System Architecture (SBSA) is a hardware system architecture for servers based on 64-bit ARM processors.

Rationale 

Historically, ARM-based products have often been tailored for specific applications and power profiles.  Variation between ARM-based hardware platforms has been an impediment requiring operating system adjustments for each product.

The SBSA seeks to strengthen the ARM ecosystem by specifying a minimal set of standardized features so that an OS built for this standard platform should function correctly without modification on all hardware products compliant with the specification.

Features 

 CPU features
 Memory management
 Peripheral access
 Interrupts
 Watchdog (errant system detection)

Existing specifications for USB, PCIe, ACPI, TPM, and other standards are incorporated to solidify the specification.

Server Base Boot Requirements 
Firmware issues are addressed separately in the Server Base Boot Requirements (SBBR) specification.

Platform validation 

The Architecture Compliance Suite (ACS) checks whether an environment is compliant with the SBSA specification, and is provided under an Apache 2 open source license.  It is available at https://github.com/ARM-software/sbsa-acs.

Compliance levels 

The specification defines levels of compliance, with level 0 being the most basic, and successive levels building on prior levels.  In the words of the spec, "Unless explicitly stated, all specification items belonging to level N apply to levels greater than N."

Level 0, 1, and 2 

Levels 0, 1, and 2 have been deprecated and folded into level 3.

Level 3 

Level 3 contains base-level specifications for:

 PE (Processing Element--a core) features
 Memory map
 Interrupt controller
 PPI (peripheral interrupt) assignments
 MMU behavior
 Clock and timer subsystem
 Wake up semantics
 Power state semantics
 Watchdogs
 Peripheral subsystems

Level 4 

Extends level 3, e.g. with support for RAS fault recovery extensions of ARMv8.2 spec.

Level 5 

Extends level 4, e.g. with support for stage 2 translation control from hypervisor as specified in ARMv8.4.

Level 6 

Extends level 5, e.g. with support for speculative execution safety features.

Versions

Initial public version 

Initial public version of the SBSA was announced on January 29, 2014.

SBSA Version 3.0 

SBSA Version 3.0 was released on February 1, 2016.

SBSA Version 5.0 

SBSA Version 5.0 was released on May 30, 2018.

SBSA Version 6.0 

SBSA Version 6.0 was released on September 16, 2019.

See also 

 UEFI
 ACPI

References 

ARM architecture
Computer hardware standards